Amaralia is a genus of catfish of the family Aspredinidae native to Amazon and Paraná-Paraguay basin. These species appear to be specialized to feed on the eggs of other catfishes; eggs found in Amaralia stomachs are thought to be those of loricariids.

Species
There are currently 2 recognized species in this genus:
 Amaralia hypsiura (Kner, 1855)
 Amaralia oviraptor Friel & Carvalho, 2016

References

Aspredinidae
Fish of South America
Catfish genera
Taxa named by Henry Weed Fowler